House raising (house lifting, house jacking, barn jacking, building jacking) is the process of separating a building from its foundation and temporarily raising it with hydraulic  screw jacks. The process is the first step in structure relocation in which the building is moved to a different location. House raising may also be a part of a renovation to build a foundation under an existing house or make a house larger by building a new floor level creating a two-story house. Often employed in areas that are prone to flooding and storm damage, this process can be achieved through the use of either timber piles or helical piles. Once a house is raised and supported on cribbing, a new foundation can be constructed beneath it. After Hurricane Katrina and Hurricane Sandy large numbers of houses in parts of Louisiana, New York and New Jersey were raised to avoid future flooding.

Other house raising technologies include the ArrowLift structural lifting system which is an alternative to jacking and shoring methods. Utilizing an electromechanical jacking mechanism, the engineered system offers clear span maneuvering beneath lifted structures.

Jacking and shoring, such as using jack posts, are used to hold a wooden building up during foundation and sill repairs.

Little published information is available about building jacking methods. The skills are usually acquired through experience working for a building jacking or moving company.

References

External links
Old-House Journal article on jacking pages 18-23.

Civil engineering
Foundations (buildings and structures)